Saint-Amans-Soult (Languedocien: Sant Amanç de Solt) is a commune in the Tarn department in southern France.

The commune was formerly called Saint-Amans-la-Bastide. It was renamed in 1851, after Marshal Jean-de-Dieu Soult, who was born there in 1769. Marshal-General Soult, under the Emperor Napoleon, was later named as Duke of Dalmatia, and following the Emperor's permanent exile to St. Helena, enjoyed a long and fruitful career as a politician and diplomant under several early 19th century royalist and republican regimes in France. His son, Napoleon H. de Soult, arranged for the posthumous publication of his father's Memoires after 1851.

Geography
The Thoré forms the commune's northern border.

See also
Communes of the Tarn department

References

Communes of Tarn (department)